Polat Kocaoğlu (born 3 May 1979) is a Turkish professional basketball player, currently plays for Gamateks Pamukkale Üniversitesi.

External links
Profile at tblstat.net
Profile at tbl.org.tr

1979 births
Living people
Darüşşafaka Basketbol players
Galatasaray S.K. (men's basketball) players
Mersin Büyükşehir Belediyesi S.K. players
Oyak Renault basketball players
Power forwards (basketball)
TED Ankara Kolejliler players
Tofaş S.K. players
Turkish men's basketball players